Patty Smyth is the second solo studio album by rock singer-songwriter Patty Smyth, formerly of Scandal; it went gold as a result of the popularity of its first single, "Sometimes Love Just Ain't Enough", which peaked at number two on the Billboard Hot 100 and also went gold. The album also produced three further singles in the opening track "No Mistakes" (top 40), then another minor hit with "I Should Be Laughing" (top 100), and finally "Shine".

Reception

Brian Mansfield of AllMusic gave the disc two stars, saying that "it's not as good as (previous album) Never Enough.

Track listing
"No Mistakes" (Patty Smyth, Kevin Savigar) – 5:23
"Too Much Love" (Michael Lunn, Sam Lorber) – 3:54
"Make Me a Believer" (Jesse Harms) – 4:38
"Sometimes Love Just Ain't Enough" with Don Henley (Smyth, Glen Burtnik) – 4:28
"Out There" (Smyth, Edward Roynesdal) – 4:46
"River of Love" (Smyth, Burtnik) – 4:23
"My Town" (Smyth, Savigar) – 4:07
"Shine" (Smyth, Burtnik) – 4:27
"One Moment to Another" (Jon Dee Graham) – 3:34
"I Should Be Laughing" (Smyth, Burtnik) – 5:04

Production

Musicians 
 Roy Bittan – producer
 Rob Jacobs – engineer, mixing 
 Brian Scheuble – assistant engineer, mix assistant 
 John Aguto – additional engineer
 Nick DiDia – additional engineer
 Dave Collins – mastering 
 Susan Dodes – A&R direction 
 Vartan Kurjian – art direction 
 Andy Engel – design 
 Randee St. Nicholas – photography

Personnel 
 Patty Smyth – lead vocals
 Roy Bittan – keyboards
 Rusty Anderson – guitars 
 Tim Pierce – guitars 
 Jimmy Rip – guitars  
 John Pierce – bass
 Kenny Aronoff – drums, percussion
 Sheryl Crow – backing vocals 
 Susie Davis – backing vocals 
 Gia Ciambotti – backing vocals 
 Kipp Lennon – backing vocals 
 Arnold McCuller – backing vocals 
 Róbert Molnár - backing vocals
 Terry Young – backing vocals
 Don Henley – harmony and lead vocals (4)
 Ruby's Class – children's choir (5)

Charts

References

1992 albums
MCA Records albums
Patty Smyth albums
Albums produced by Roy Bittan